Oleksandr Dekhtyarenko (born 13 February 1996 in Ukraine), is a professional Ukrainian football defender who played for FC Illichivets Mariupol in the Ukrainian Premier League.

He is mainly product of FC Illichivets Mariupol sportive school.

Dekhtyarenko made his début for FC Illichivets Mariupol in the Ukrainian Premier League on 30 November 2014.

References

External links

Ukrainian footballers
FC Mariupol players
Ukrainian Premier League players
Association football defenders
1996 births
Living people
Footballers from Odesa